The Grenadines is a chain of small islands that lie on a line between the larger islands of Saint Vincent and Grenada in the Lesser Antilles. Nine are inhabited and open to the public (or ten, if the offshore island of Young Island is counted): Bequia, Mustique, Canouan, Union Island, Petit St Vincent, Palm Island and Mayreau, all in Saint Vincent and the Grenadines, plus Petite Martinique and Carriacou in Grenada. Several additional privately owned islands such as Calivigny are also inhabited. Notable uninhabited islands of the Grenadines include Petit Nevis, used by whalers, and Petit Mustique, which was the centre of a prominent real estate scam in the early 2000s.

The northern two-thirds of the chain, including about 32 islands and cays, are part of the country of Saint Vincent and the Grenadines. The southern third of the chain belongs to the country of Grenada. Carriacou is the largest and most populous of the Grenadines.

Geographic boundaries
The islands are politically divided between the island nations of Saint Vincent and the Grenadines and Grenada. They lie between the islands of Saint Vincent in the north and Grenada in the south. Neither Saint Vincent nor Grenada are Grenadine islands. The islands north of the Martinique Channel belong to Saint Vincent and the Grenadines and the islands south of the channel belong to Grenada.

Larger islands of the Grenadines

Saint Vincent and the Grenadines
The total population of the Grenadine islands within Saint Vincent and the Grenadines is estimated to be 10,234.
The following islands make up the Grenadines Parish:

Grenada
Carriacou and Petite Martinique is a dependency of Grenada and has a population of 10,900 people. Carriacou is the largest of the Grenadine chain. These islands contains:

References

External links

Islands of Saint Vincent and the Grenadines
Islands of Grenada
International archipelagoes
Grenada–Saint Vincent and the Grenadines border